Flying Luck is a 1927 American silent comedy film directed by Herman C. Raymaker and starring Monty Banks, Jean Arthur and Jack W. Johnston.

Cast
 Monty Banks as The Boy 
 Jean Arthur as The Girl 
 Jack W. Johnston as The Colonel 
 Kewpie Morgan as The Sergeant 
 Eddy Chandler as The Corporal 
 Silver Harr as The Orderly 
 Louise Carver as A Passerby

References

Bibliography
 Brent E. Walker. Mack Sennett’s Fun Factory: A History and Filmography of His Studio and His Keystone and Mack Sennett Comedies, with Biographies of Players and Personnel. McFarland, 2013.

External links
 

1927 films
1927 comedy films
1920s English-language films
American silent feature films
Silent American comedy films
Films directed by Herman C. Raymaker
American black-and-white films
Pathé Exchange films
1920s American films